Mary Hart is an American television personality.

Mary Hart may also refer to:
Mary Theresa Hart, American artist and illustrator
Mary Seymour, possible married name Mary Hart, daughter of Catherine Parr and Thomas Seymour
Mary de Vere, married name Mary Hart, English noble
Lynne Roberts, American actress, also credited as Mary Hart
The Mary Hart Show, a fictional talk show which stars Mary Hart as the title role within the ABC Family comedy show Baby Daddy